G-Funk is a 2017 documentary film distributed by YouTube Premium. The film uses previously unreleased archival footage to describe the rise of G-Funk in the early 1990s. It features interviews with Warren G, Snoop Dogg, Chuck D, Ice Cube, Ice-T, Too Short, The D.O.C., Wiz Khalifa and others. The film was produced by Gary Ousdahl, Warren G, Rafael Chavez and Bob Ruggeri.

References

External links
 

2017 films
YouTube Premium films
American documentary films
Documentary films about music and musicians
2010s English-language films
2010s American films